George Frederick Wallace (31 July 1913 – 19 September 1997) was a New Zealand cricketer. He played six first-class matches for Auckland between 1936 and 1946. His younger brother was New Zealand cricketer Merv Wallace.

See also
 List of Auckland representative cricketers

References

External links
 

1913 births
1997 deaths
New Zealand cricketers
Auckland cricketers
Cricketers from Auckland